Phyllis Wong is a female international Hong Kong Chinese lawn bowler.

Bowls career

World Championships
In 2020 she was selected for the 2020 World Outdoor Bowls Championship in Australia.

Asia Pacific
So won a bronze medal in the fours with Gloria Ha, Angel So and Cheryl Chan at the 2019 Asia Pacific Bowls Championships, held in the Gold Coast, Queensland.

References

Chinese bowls players
Hong Kong female bowls players
Living people
Year of birth missing (living people)